The Gulf Coast Chaos were a W-League club based in Biloxi, Mississippi. The team folded after the 1997 season

Year-by-year

Defunct USL W-League (1995–2015) teams
Defunct soccer clubs in Mississippi
1997 establishments in Mississippi
1997 disestablishments in Mississippi
Women's sports in Mississippi